Calke is a civil parish in the South Derbyshire district of Derbyshire, England.  The parish contains 20 listed buildings that are recorded in the National Heritage List for England.  Of these, one is listed at Grade I, the highest of the three grades, two are at Grade II*, the middle grade, and the others are at Grade II, the lowest grade.  The parish contains the village of Calke, but is largely occupied by the country house, Calke Abbey, and its grounds.  The house is listed, as are associated buildings, and structures in the grounds, including a church, an orangery, deer shelters, and an entrance lodge.  The other listed building is a house in the village.


Key

Buildings

References

Citations

Sources

 

Lists of listed buildings in Derbyshire